2006–07 Croatian First League was the 17th season of the Croatian handball league since its independence and the sixth season of the First League format.

League table and results

First phase

Group A

Group B

Source: Rk-zamet.hr

Second phase

Championship play-offs
Intermediate matches from the first phase were transferred, and with the opponent from the same group played two more games, and the other group of four matches (a total of 10 matches).

Relegation play-offs
Play-offs to stay in the First league or to be demoted to the Second League for teams from 7 to 16 place. The clubs that played in the same groups have passed their results and played in the league of 12 matches against the other 6 clubs with which they were not in the same stage of the first stage (12 matches), giving a total of 22 matches for each club.

Final 
Played by two first teams from  Championship play-offs . The Champion becomes the first team to score 10 points. The results from the previous stages of the championship are transmitted.

* home match for Croatia Osiguranje Zagreb 
A - matches played during First phase (Group A) 
B - matches played during Championship play-offs 
C - matches played during Final

League for the 1 League

Final standings

Sources 
 Fredi Kramer, Dražen Pinević: Hrvatski rukomet = Croatian handball, Zagreb, 2009.
 hrt.hr, ljestvica i rezultati 1. dijela
hrt.hr, ljestvica i rezultati Lige 16
European Handball Federation

References

2006-07
handball
handball
Croatia